AP9, AP-9, AP.9, AP 9, or variant may refer to:
 Autopista AP-9, an expressway in Galicia, Spain
 Seversky AP-9, USAAC fighter
 , US Navy World War II Harris-class attack transport
 AA Arms AP-9 semi-automatic 9mm pistol
 FEG AP9 semi-automatic 9mm pistol
 (47091) 1999 AP9, AP9 asteroid discovered in 1999, the 47091st asteroid ever discovered
 AP.9 (rap artist) aka Bishop Shakur (born 1974), American rap artist